Roy Schmidt (born 30 September 1991 in Leipzig) is a German sprinter. He represented his country in the 4 × 100 metres relay at the 2017 World Championships without qualifying for the final. In addition, he won a bronze medal in the same event at the 2016 European Championships.

International competitions

Personal bests

Outdoor
100 metres – 10.23 (+0.1 m/s, La Chaux des Fonds 2019)
200 metres – 20.85 (+1.8 m/s, Mannheim 2014)

Indoor
60 metres – 6.70 (Erfurt 2018)
200 metres – 21.16 (Metz 2009)
400 metres – 48.97 (Chemnitz 2011)

References

1991 births
Living people
German male sprinters
World Athletics Championships athletes for Germany
Athletes from Leipzig
SC DHfK Leipzig athletes